Galectin-3 is a protein that in humans is encoded by the LGALS3 gene.  Galectin-3 is a member of the lectin family, of which 14 mammalian galectins have been identified.

Galectin-3 is approximately 30 kDa and, like all galectins, contains a carbohydrate-recognition-binding domain (CRD) of about 130 amino acids that enable the specific binding of β-galactosides.

Galectin-3 (Gal-3) is also a member of the beta-galactoside-binding protein family that plays an important role in cell-cell adhesion, cell-matrix interactions, macrophage activation, angiogenesis, metastasis, apoptosis.

Galectin-3 is encoded by a single gene, LGALS3, located on chromosome 14, locus q21–q22. Galectin-3 is expressed in the nucleus, cytoplasm, mitochondrion, cell surface, and extracellular space.

Function 

Galectin-3 has an affinity for beta-galactosides and exhibits antimicrobial activity against bacteria and fungi.

This protein has been shown to be involved in the following biological processes: cell adhesion, cell activation and chemoattraction, cell growth and differentiation, cell cycle, and apoptosis. Given galectin-3's broad biological functionality, it has been demonstrated to be involved in cancer, inflammation and fibrosis, heart disease, and stroke. Studies have also shown that the expression of galectin-3 is implicated in a variety of processes associated with heart failure, including myofibroblast proliferation, fibrogenesis, tissue repair, inflammation, and ventricular remodeling.

Galectin-3 associates with the primary cilium and modulates renal cyst growth in congenital polycystic kidney disease.

The functional roles of galectins in cellular response to membrane damage are rapidly expanding. It has recently shown that Galectin-3 recruits ESCRTs to damaged lysosomes so that lysosomes can be repaired.

Clinical significance

Fibrosis 

A correlation between galectin-3 expression levels and various types of fibrosis has been found. Galectin-3 is upregulated in cases of liver fibrosis, renal fibrosis, and idiopathic pulmonary fibrosis (IPF). In several studies with mice deficient in or lacking galectin-3, conditions that caused control mice to develop IPF, renal, or liver fibrosis either induced limited fibrosis or failed to induce fibrosis entirely. Companies have developed galectin modulators that block the binding of galectins to carbohydrate structures. The galectin-3 inhibitor, TD139 and GR-MD-02 have the potential to treat fibrosis.

Cardiovascular disease 

Elevated levels of galectin-3 have been found to be significantly associated with higher risk of death in both acute decompensated heart failure and chronic heart failure populations.  In normal human, murine, and rat cells galectin-3 levels are low. However, as heart disease  progresses, significant upregulation of galectin-3 occurs in the myocardium.

Galectin-3  also may be used as a biomarker to identify at risk individuals, and predict patient response to different drugs and therapies. For instance, galectin-3 levels could be used in early detection of failure-prone hearts and lead to intervention strategies including broad spectrum anti-inflammatory agents. One study concluded  that individuals with systolic heart failure of ischaemic origin  and elevated galectin-3 levels may benefit from statin treatment. Galectin-3 has also been associated as a factor promoting ventricular remodeling following mitral valve repair, and may identify patients requiring  additional therapies to obtain beneficial reverse remodeling.

Cancer 

The wide variety of effects of galectin-3 on cancerous cells are due to the unique structure and various interaction properties of the molecule. Overexpression and changes in the localization of galectin-3 molecules  affects the prognosis of the patient and targeting the actions of galectin-3 poses a promising therapeutic strategy for the development of effective therapeutic agents for cancer treatment.

Overexpression and changes in sub- and inter-cellular localization of galectin-3 are commonly seen in cancerous conditions. The many interaction and binding properties of galectin-3 influence various cell activities based on its location. Altered galectin-3 expression can affect cancer cell growth and differentiation, chemoattraction, apoptosis, immunosuppression, angiogenesis, adhesion, invasion and metastasis.

Galectin-3 overexpression promotes neoplastic transformation and the maintenance of transformed phenotypes as well as enhances the tumour cell's adhesion to the extracellular matrix and increase metastatic spreading. Galectin-3 can be either an inhibitory or a promoting apoptotic depending on its sub-cellular localization. In immune regulation, galectin-3 can regulate immune cell activities and helps contribute to the tumour cell's evasion of the immune system. Galectin-3 also helps promote angiogenesis.

The roles of galectins and galectin-3, in particular, in cancer have been heavily investigated. Of note, galectin-3 has been suggested to play important roles in cancer metastasis.

Clinical applications

Cardiovascular risk indicator 
Chronic heart failure has been found to be indicated by a galectin-3 tests, using the ARCHITECT immunochemistry platform developed by BG Medicine and marketed by Abbott, helping to determine which patients are most at risk for the disease. This test is also offered on the VIDAS platform marketed by bioMérieux. Pecta-Sol C binds to galectin-3 binding sites on the surfaces of cells as a preventative measure created by Isaac Eliaz in conjunction with EcoNugenics.

Galectin-3 is upregulated in patients with idiopathic pulmonary fibrosis. The cells that receive galectin-3 stimulation (fibroblasts, epithelial cells, and myofibroblasts) upregulated the formation of fibrosis and  collagen formation. Fibrosis is necessary in many aspects of intrabody regeneration. The myocardial lining constantly undergoes necessary fibrosis, and the inhibition of galectin-3 interferes with myocardial fibrogenesis. A study concluded that pharmacological inhibition of galectin-3 attenuates cardiac fibrosis, LV dysfunction, and subsequent heart failure development.

Drug development  

Galecto Biotech in Sweden is focused on developing drugs targeting galectin-3 to treat fibrosis, specifically idiopathic pulmonary fibrosis.  Galectin Therapeutics in the United States is also targeting galectins for clinical applications.  Preclinical studies demonstrate that inhibition of galectin-3 significantly reduces portal hypertension and fibrosis.  Galectin Therapeutics galectin-3 inhibitor GR-MD-02 (belapectin) is currently in human clinical trials for nonalcoholic steatohepatitis (NASH) and for increasing the effectiveness and reducing side effects of cancer immunotherapy.

Biomarkers 

Galectin-3 is increasingly being used as a diagnostic marker for different cancers. It can be screened for and used as a prognostic factor to predict the progression of the cancer. Galectin-3 has varying effects in different types of cancer. One approach to cancers with high galectin-3 expression is to inhibit galectin-3 to enhance treatment response.

Interactions 

LGALS3 has been shown to interact with LGALS3BP.

In melanocytic cells LGALS3 gene expression may be regulated by MITF.

References

Lectins